Airport station is a rapid transit station in Boston, Massachusetts. It serves the MBTA Blue Line and the SL3 branch of the Silver Line. It is located in East Boston under the interchange between Interstate 90 and Massachusetts Route 1A. The station provides one of two mass transit connections to the nearby Logan International Airport, as well as serving local residents in East Boston. Shuttle buses connect the station with the airport terminals and other facilities. 

At Airport, trains switch between the third rail power used in the East Boston Tunnel to overhead wires used on the surface line to Revere. The original brick station built in 1952 was replaced by a modern station with steel and glass canopies in 2004.

History

The Metropolitan Transit Authority (MTA) opened the first phase of the Revere Extension on January 5, 1952, with new stations at Airport, Wood Island, and Orient Heights. This phase connected the East Boston Tunnel at Maverick to the Boston, Revere Beach and Lynn narrow gauge right of way between Wood Island and Orient Heights. For a short distance that includes Airport station, this connecting line follows a right of way, now the East Boston Greenway, that was once used by the Grand Junction Railroad and the Eastern Railroad. Airport was the first American urban transit connection to a commercial airport. The station was modernized in 1967-68 as part of a $9 million systemwide station improvement program.

Reconstruction
In April 2000, the Massachusetts Bay Transportation Authority began construction on a $23 million project to replace the 1952-built station. The new station, located approximately 500 feet east of the old station due to Big Dig relocation of highway ramps, opened June 3, 2004. It is fully accessible, with the platforms connected by a pedestrian bridge with elevators, and has longer platforms than the previous station in order to accommodate 6-car trains (which began operation in 2008). The station includes several features to serve airport travelers, including luggage slides adjacent to the faregates, wider escalators and elevators, and monitors showing flight statuses.

In 2001, the MBTA began a $2.3 million federally-funded program to install ten new works and restore existing pieces. The centerpiece of the program was Totems of Light, a pair of  stained glass windows at the rebuilt Airport station. Designed by Linda Lichtman, the work cost $90,000.

Silver Line
Until 2005, the station was the primary rapid transit link between Boston to the airport. As part of Big Dig environmental mitigation, the state was mandated to run Silver Line service to the airport terminals. Full-time service from South Station began on June 1, 2005. This SL1 service has replaced the transfer at Airport station for many travelers, although the station still sees substantial airport traffic.

Airport station was a proposed stop on the Urban Ring Project. The Urban Ring was to be a circumferential bus rapid transit (BRT) line designed to connect the current radial MBTA rail lines, to reduce overcrowding in the downtown stations, but it was canceled in 2010. Under draft plans released in 2008, a new surface-level BRT platform was to be built on the north side of the existing busway. Although the full project was shelved due to the MBTA's financial difficulties, some corridor routes received more limited work, including a branch of the Silver Line to Chelsea. The new branch separates from the SL1 route before Logan Airport; it stops at Airport station at the previously proposed spot, then runs over a haul road and a new busway constructed on a former section of the Grand Junction Railroad. The SL3 service began on April 21, 2018.

Plans
In October 2015, Massport released plans for a major expansion of Terminal E which would include a pedestrian bridge directly to the station. With half a mile between the terminal and the station, the moving walkways for the connection would be among the longest in the world. In April 2018, Massport announced a $15 million study of a possible automated people mover system to connect the Airport Station with the four terminals, rental car center, and economy parking. It would replace the shuttle busses and serve instead of the proposed walkway. Implementation was estimated to cost $1 billion and take ten years.

Bus connections

Massport operates free shuttle bus service between Airport station and the arrivals levels of Logan's airline terminals.  Shuttle bus service operates seven days per week.  All shuttle buses are wheelchair lift-equipped for handicapped accessibility.  These services are:

22 Services terminals A & B, Airport station, and Rental Car Center (7AM-10PM)
33 Services terminals C & E, Airport station, and Rental Car Center (7AM-10PM)
55 Services all terminals, Airport station, and Rental Car Center (early morning and late evening off-peak hours)
66 Services all terminals, water shuttle dock and Airport station

The only MBTA bus route that stops at the station, besides the Silver Line BRT's SL3 branch, is the early-morning route . Route 171 and the Silver Line SL1 branch also run to the airport terminals.

Station layout 

The station serves the East Boston neighborhood in addition to the airport, with an entrance on the west side to Bremen Street via Bremen Street Park. The East Boston Greenway passes through the park and bicycle parking is provided at the Bremen Street entrance. The station includes a no-fare passageway from that entrance to the east side of the station where the Massport shuttle buses stop. A path from the east side leads to the East Boston Memorial Stadium and to the Rental Car Center, where there is also bicycle parking.

References

External links

MBTA - Airport
Blue Line platform level from Google Maps Street View

Blue Line (MBTA) stations
Railway stations in Boston
Airport railway stations in the United States
Railway stations in the United States opened in 1952
East Boston
Railway stations with vitreous enamel panels
Logan International Airport